The Underworld Regime is the debut studio album by Ov Hell. It was released on 8 February 2010.

Tracks

Personnel
Ov Hell
Shagrath – lead vocals 
King ov Hell – bass, backing vocals

Additional personnel
Ice Dale – guitar (1, 2, 5–8)
Teloch – guitar (3-4)
Frost – drums
Herbrand Larsen - Keyboard, Samples, Effects
Trym Hartmark Visnes - Keyboard, Samples, Effects

References

2010 debut albums
Ov Hell albums
Indie Recordings albums
Prosthetic Records albums